Queen Secret Keeper is the twelfth studio album by the British singer-songwriter Judie Tzuke, released in 2001.

Track listing
 "Don't Look Behind You"
 "The One That Got Away"
 "Do You"
 "1 2 3"
 "Drive"
 "Indian Giver"
 "On Days Like These"
 "All of Me"
 "One Minute"
 "Little Diva"
 "Breathless"
 "Lion"

References
Official website

Judie Tzuke albums
2001 albums